Gyaltsen may refer to:

Choekyi Gyaltsen (1938–1989), the 10th Panchen Lama of Gelug School of Tibetan Buddhism
Dolpopa Sherab Gyaltsen (1292–1361), the Tibetan Buddhist master known as "The Buddha from Dolpo"
Jetsun Dragpa Gyaltsen (1147–1216), Tibetan spiritual leader and the third of the Five Venerable Supreme Sakya Masters of Tibet
Indrani Aikath Gyaltsen (born 1952), freelance journalist from Chaibasa, Bihar
Jamphel Yeshe Gyaltsen (1910–1947), Tibetan tulku and the fifth Reting Rinpoche
Khunu Lama Tenzin Gyaltsen (1895–1977), known also as Tenzin Gyaltsen Negi, Khunu Rinpoche and Negi Lama
Lobsang Chökyi Gyaltsen (1570–1662), the fourth Panchen Lama of Tibet, and the first to be accorded this title during his lifetime
Shardza Tashi Gyaltsen (1859–1933 or 1935), great Dzogchen master of the Tibetan Bonpo tradition
Tai Situ Changchub Gyaltsen (1302–1364 (or ?1371)), key figure in Tibetan History
Tulku Dragpa Gyaltsen (1619–1656), important Gelugpa lama and a contemporary of the Fifth Dalai Lama (1617–1682)